Hitler and the Occult, produced by Bram Roos and Phyllis Cannon, and narrated by actor David Ackroyd, is a 50-minute History Channel documentary regarding Nazi occultism.

Television and DVD release
The documentary was originally shown on television and subsequently released on DVD on February 8, 2000 by A&E Home Video. It is in colour and in the English language. It is part of the In Search of History series.

Synopsis
The documentary incorrectly claimed that Nazi Party grew out of several occult groups that sprang up in the late 19th century as a reaction to the advanced materialism and technology of the era. These groups spoke of the coming of a new Messiah that would save Germany. Hitler developed the notion that perhaps he was the chosen one to save the German people. In reality, the political parties created in the wake of the country's defeat in World War I combined nationalistic sentiment to forge an image of a superior German people, a sentiment already present in German society. Hitler's imprisonment after the failed 1923 Munich Beer Hall Putsch would make him a national hero for his defense of a strong German state, convincing him that he was the Messiah who could save Germany.

Hitler appropriated Christian symbolism, such as the Spear of Destiny and the Holy Grail for his own purposes. He adopted the swastika, a transcultural symbol for the Sun. The original symbol turns clockwise, whereas the appropriated Nazi one turns backwards. 

At the conclusion, author Dusty Sklar points out that Hitler's suicide happened during the night of April 30 – May 1, known as Walpurgis Night. The narrator continues: "With Hitler gone, it was as if a spell had been broken". Then Joachim von Ribbentrop's infamous statement of his continued subservience to Hitler at the Nuremberg trials is taken as final evidence of Hitler's "occult power": ("Even with all I know, if in this cell Hitler should come to me and say 'Do this!', I would still do it.").

See also
 Guido von List
 Karl Spiesberger
 Wilhelm Wulff
 Nazis: The Occult Conspiracy

References 

2000 films
American documentary films
History (American TV channel) original programming
Documentary films about Adolf Hitler
Occultism in Nazism
2000s English-language films
2000s American films